Florida's 6th congressional district is a congressional district in the U.S. state of Florida. The district is located on the Eastern Florida Coast and stretches from the southern Jacksonville suburbs to New Smyrna Beach.  It includes the city of Daytona Beach.

From 2003 to 2013 the district stretched from the St. Johns River and Jacksonville, sweeping through North Central Florida, encompassing portions of Gainesville and Ocala, and meandered down to the northern tip of the Greater Orlando area in Lake County. It included all of Bradford and Gilchrist counties and portions of Alachua, Clay, Duval, Lake, Levy, and Marion counties. Most of this district is now the 3rd District, while the current 6th covers most of the territory that was previously in the 7th district.

The district is currently represented by Republican Michael Waltz.

Recent results in statewide elections 

The district contains over 525,000 registered voters, of whom just over 39% are Democratic, while slightly more than 41% identify as Republican.

List of members representing the district

Election results

2000

2002

2004

2006

2008

2010

2016

2018

2020 

{{Election box candidate with party link no change|

2022 

{{Election box candidate with party link no change|

Historical district boundaries

References 

 Congressional Biographical Directory of the United States 1774–present

06
1945 establishments in Florida